Odivelas Futebol Clube is a sporting association in the city of Odivelas, in Greater Lisbon. It was founded in 1939 and has three football fields a gymnasium and other facilities. Odivelas F.C has won the Third Division in 1993. At youth level Odivelas is one of the best academies in the country with players like Sílvio Manuel Pereira and Roderick Miranda coming out of their ranks.

Recent Years

Odivelas F.C. is currently in a massive financial crisis with lack of funds to support the team. This resulted in a couple of bad seasons that saw Odivelas slip from Second Division to the Regional Leagues. Last season, Odivelas was out of the National League system for the first time in many years achieving a modest 8th place in Lisbon Regional League. But the worst problem last season was play home-matches away from Estádio Arnaldo Dias. Odivelas F.C. had to play their matches on a loaned-field in neighbouring city Lisbon, which drove away the fans from the team.

Squad

Notable players

  Pedro Filipe Franco (1992–1994)
  Luís Alves (1993–1994)
  Sílvio Manuel Pereira (2007–08)
  Roderick Miranda
  José Filipe Correia Semedo

References

External links
Official site 

 
Football clubs in Portugal
Association football clubs established in 1939
1939 establishments in Portugal